is a Japanese football player who plays for Kagoshima United FC in the J3 League.

Career statistics
Updated to end of 2018 season.

References

External links
Profile at Mito HollyHock
Profile at Tokushima Vortis

1987 births
Living people
Association football people from Tokyo
Japanese footballers
J1 League players
J2 League players
J3 League players
Kawasaki Frontale players
Giravanz Kitakyushu players
Oita Trinita players
Tokushima Vortis players
Roasso Kumamoto players
Mito HollyHock players
Kagoshima United FC players
Association football midfielders